This is a list of publicly-traded and private real estate investment trusts (REITs) in Canada.

Current REITs

Former REITs 

 Legacy Hotels REIT
 Retirement Residences REIT (now Revera)

References 

 
Canada economy-related lists
Finance lists
Real estate lists
Finance in Canada
Investment Trusts of Canada